Youth's Endearing Charm (also known as Youth's Melting Pot) is a 1916 American silent drama film directed by William C. Dowlan. The film stars Mary Miles Minter, Wallace McDonald, and Harry von Meter. The script for the film was adapted by J. Edward Hungerford from a novel of the same name written by Maibelle Heikes Justice. This was Minter's first film with Mutual Film, having previously been with Metro Pictures. A print is preserved at the Library of Congress.

Plot

As described in film magazines, orphan Mary Wade (Minter) is taken in by Farmer Jenkins and his wife. After two years of drudgery and ill-treatment, she runs away to the city along with her faithful dog Zippy. With no means of supporting herself, Mary poses as a blind beggar. This ruse lands her in jail, where a fellow custodian is Harry Disbrow, a wealthy young man who has been arrested for drunkenness.

Harry is rapidly released, and, having taken an interest in Mary, he finds her employment in his parents' home as a servant. He rapidly falls in love with her, but he has been engaged to Maud Horton, the daughter of his father's business partner. At a ball given to celebrate this engagement, Mary decides to don a dress of Maud's and attend; Mrs. Disbrow passes off the girl as her niece.

It transpires that Maud's father, George Horton, has been systematically robbing from the family, including stealing a bundle of securities from a safe during the ball. When the theft is discovered, a fight ensues between Horton and Mr. Disbrow. When the pocketbook containing the securities falls from Horton's pocket, Mary takes the opportunity to seize the securities, and also to break a vase upon Horton's head. In gratitude for her bravery and for saving the family's fortunes, the Disbrows approve of Mary's marriage to Harry.

Cast
 Mary Miles Minter as Mary Wade
 Wallace MacDonald as Harry Disbrow
 Harry von Meter as John Disbrow
 Gertrude Le Brandt as  Mrs. Disbrow
 Al Ferguson as Joe Jenkins
 Bessie Banks as Mrs. Jenkins
 Harvey Clark as George Horton
 Margaret Nichols as Maud Horton

References

External links

1916 films
1916 drama films
Silent American drama films
American silent feature films
American black-and-white films
Films based on American novels
Films directed by William C. Dowlan
1910s American films